Matteo Rubbiani (Carpi, 31 August 1978) is an Italian pole vaulter.

Biography
Matteo Rubbiani won one medal, at senior level, at the International athletics competitions. He has 4 caps in national team from 2004 to 2007, he also has won 3 times the individual national championship.

Achievements

National titles
1 win in the pole vault at the Italian Athletics Championships (2007)
2 wins in the pole vault at the Italian Athletics Indoor Championships (2006, 2008)

See also
Italy at the Military World Games

References

External links
 

1978 births
Living people
Sportspeople from Carpi, Emilia-Romagna
Italian male pole vaulters
Athletics competitors of Centro Sportivo Aeronautica Militare